Prince Srisiddhi Thongjaya, the Prince Siridhaj Sangkas (16 October 185711 March 1910) was a Prince of Siam. As a son of King Mongkut and Chao Chom Manda Bua, he was a member of Siamese royal family.

His mother was a daughter of Chao Phraya Nakhon Noi, a son of King Taksin. He was given full name as Phra Chao Borom Wong Ther Phra Ong Chao Srisiddhi Thongjaya Krom Khun Siridhaj Sangkas.

He had 4 siblings: 1 elder brother, 1 younger sister, and 2 younger brothers:

 Prince Chalermlaksanaloet 
 Princess Oradaya Debkanya
 Prince Vadhananuwongse
 

He was the minister of Finance from 1894 to 1896.

References 

1857 births
1910 deaths
19th-century Chakri dynasty
20th-century Chakri dynasty
Chakri dynasty
Thai male Phra Ong Chao
Children of Mongkut
People from Bangkok
Presidents of the Supreme Court of Thailand
Ministers of Finance of Thailand
Members of the Privy Council of Thailand
Sons of kings